Eudolium pyriforme, common name  the false tun shell, is a species of large, rare, deepwater sea snail, a marine gastropod mollusc in the family Tonnidae, the tun snails.

This species has a wide distribution, including Australia, Hawaii, Japan, New Zealand, and South Africa.

References

Tonnidae
Gastropods described in 1914